Eluoma (or Eluama) is a town in Amawu, Isuikwuato, Abia State  of Nigeria. It is the largest town in Isuikwuato, having more than 10 distinct villages. It also occupies the largest geographical space in the whole of Isuikwuato, and has the most varied vegetation, relief and drainage. It shares boundaries with Amiyi Amaokwo, Amiyi Obilohia, Otampa, Umuasua, Umuobiala, Nnunya and Umuahia. It is a few kilometres from Abia State University, Uturu, Abia State and about 20 kilometres from Umuahia, the capital of Abia State, in the South Eastern part of Nigeria. Eluoma people are Igbos  by ethnicity and belong to what was formally called Igbo Union from which the "Central Igbo" was derived.

Composition
The villages or communities that make up Eluoma are Ekebe, Umuama, Umuebere Aja, Umuebere Nkuma (Obu-Na-Ebere Nkuma), Obodo, Umusoo, Umuokogbuo, Umuerem, Ndi Ogu, Umuezeoka, Umuihe (formerly, Umu Ohu) and Igidi-Inyim. Apart from Obodo, Umuama, Umusoo and Ekebe, each of the above villages or communities are geographically separated by distances ranging from two kilometres to seven or more kilometres.

History
The founder and father of people of Eluoma (Eluama) was Ama, the son of Awu. 
Ama has two wives and four sons, Ebe, Obu, Ama and Ogwugwu.  Ebe and Ama lived in close proximity because they are from the same mother. Ebe the first son derived the name Ekebe from Eke Ukwu market while Ama his younger brother lives close to him in d area presently call Umuama. Obu and Ogwugwu were from the same mother, they moved and lived about seven hundred meters from their kins. Sometime later, Obu accused Ogwugwu of stealing yams from his barn.  Ogwugwu denied it and took oath.  He survived the oath after one year as he surfaced alive from Ubiyi cave. Obu was remorseful when he saw his brother Ogwugwu alive. He made the celebrated statement. "Beru" which translates to please am sorry, pardon me or forgive me of the wrongful accusation.  From "Beru", "Eberu" replaced the name Ogwugwu, The Umueberu name later become Umuebere. Then Ezebe become part of Eluama. 
Eluoma people settled in their present location long ago, possibly over three hundred years ago as a part of the general migration that took place at the time.

Umuebere Nkuma and the Obu people occupy the strip of land where the land produces palm products in abundance, cassava, yam and other tropical crops. This portion of land is well watered. It is the food basket of the community. Umuerem and Umuokogbuo people also have a fertile for agriculture.

Government and politics
Like most Igbos, Eluoma people never had a single king or ruler in the time past. Communal issues were settled by elders delegated from the different villages who decided on the basis of majority votes. “Igbo ama eze” is how Igbos put it. The same applied in the villages. Adult males took the most important decisions while women always had their own government. Thus decisions were by universal adult male suffrage.

However, in the mid-seventies, the Federal Military Government of Nigeria, led by people of Northern extraction began to foist their oligarchic system of administration on the whole country, particularly the East, through the Military Governors whom they appointed. These governors in turn requested for “chiefs” or traditional rulers to be installed. Like all other  Igbo societies, the first generation of chiefs were persuaded to accept the position. The first chief or eze Eluoma had was His Royal Highness, Eze Innocent Eloagu from Umuama.  Later on, the same Eloagu went on to become the first eze in Amawu.

At the moment, Eluoma no longer has any one eze or chief. There are several autonomous communities, following the manipulation of the political class who needed to reduce the powers of traditional rulers. Each village now has its own chief democratically chosen through consultations and recommendation by all adult males.

Eluoma has represented Isuikwuato, perhaps more than any other town, in government political appointments at the state level. It has produced many commissioners in the past. It also produced the Second Republic House Assembly member, Hon. Barrister Vincent Eyi Uwanna.  It also produced a military governor. The only town that has a comparable record is Ovim which produced military governors and Federal Minister/Senator although only two did all these for them.

Of particular note is the maverick scholar, philosopher/poet, Chinweizu whose influence straddles the globe, particularly the black world. He hails from Umuokogbuo, Eluoma and has been a source of inspiration and pride to Eluoma people. He has debated other scholar like Ali Mazrui and unmasked Wole Soyinka's obscurantist writings.cateroy:african writers

Social development
The central market for all Eluoma people is Ahonta located between Obodo, Ekebe, Umusoo, Amaeke and Umuebere Aja. This led to the establishment of other social-cultural and economic ventures around Ahonta. A civic centre with a postal agency was constructed in the 1970s through communal efforts. Ahonta Market itself was developed into a modern market in the same 70s by tasking each village to build a block of stalls. There is a health centre and electrification project that did more to divide Eluoma people than unite them.

The Eluoma Development Union (EDU) co-ordinates socio-cultural development although many have seen its past projects as partial and targeted at marginalising the other villages far away from Ahonta. For example, the electrification of Eluoma was undertaken as a communal project with each household contributing agreed amounts. However, once electricity got to central Eluoma, the rest of the Eluoma were left to themselves with the result that two decades after the arrival of electricity in Eluoma, some villages were still to enjoy it due their inability to extend it to themselves. Like a family, the offended villages have moved on and Eluoma is one still united entity having more in common that differences.

Of recent, the Eluomna Believers' Fellowship has been collaborating with the EDU and churches to reach out to youths who reside in Eluoma through a project tagged Eluoma Youth Development Initiative. The aim is to motivate and mobilise youths towards dreaming big and achieving those dreams. This sill stop or reduce the incidence of truancy, crime, thuggery and other social vices in the town.

Institutions
One of the most famous institutions in Eluoma is the Eluoma Central School, now a ghost of itself former self. It was proposed that Eluoma Secondary School, built in the late 1970s through communal efforts, should be done at the site of Eluoma Central School but certain political forces conspired to have the new school built in their backyard. In consequence, much financial resources were wasted building on virgin land. The secondary school could not develop beyond its foundation level. Nevertheless, it has produced important people who are contributing to the development of Eluoma as well as retain its prestige as the highest institution of learning in Eluoma.

Besides, St Agnes Primary School is also popular in terms of products and being one of the oldest schools in Eluoma. Other schools are Uporoto Primary School, Obu-Na-Ebere Primary School and others. There has been some private initiative at establishing secondary schools. Universal Commercial School was founded at Obodo while an Onward Commercial School founded at Ali Ukanze.

Festivals
The most popular festivals in Eluoma are Christmas, Iri Ji, Ahia Egwu and Onunu Ji.  Due to the advance of Christianity though, the rest apart from Christmas and perhaps Iri Ji, are nearly extinct.

August meeting
Some time ago, progressive-minded women of Eluoma began to organise an annual homecoming for women  called August Meeting ostensibly for the development of the land of Eluoma. This entailed a mass return of Eluoma women living outside to Eluoma.

Drainage
Eluoma is watered by Eze-Iyi, Adaoma, Ubiyi, Nneochie and many other streams and a few springs. Umuebere Nkuma (Obu-Na-Ebere Nkuma) has the largest number of streams and springs. Sharing the great Eze Iyi with others, they also have Adaoma, Ubiyi, Ndoahau, Iyi Ndemgbelu, Agboebo, Iyi Eke, Agbouhu, Agbocha, Ugwuede, Onuahia, Onuosovaravara, Onu Okpuocha, Onu Uhie, Onu Uke, Onu Ejiofo, Iyi Eke, etc.

These streams flow all round the year ensuring that dry season farming is possible in the town. The only exception is Adaoma that dries up at certain portions of it during rainy season and comes back during dry season. The intriguing nature of Adaoma appearing like a lake and then as an underground stream that surfaces at intervals is what probably led to the veneration of the stream by Owu Mmiri people.

Ubi Iyi serves Umuebere Aja, Obu Aja and even parts of Ekebe and Obodo. Eze-Iyi serves Obodo and Umuama. Both are partly also served by Isi Iyi. Each village or community has a number of streams serving it. Some streams are so far away that they only serve farmers while in their distant farms.

Relief
The town is flat from the entrance from Oguduasaa and Umuobiala ends only. From all other entrances, the town is an amalgam of hills and valleys. The great Valley of Umuebere Nkuma marks a major shift in relief and also affects the drainage.

Economy
Being a rural community, Eluoma survives on subsistence farming and the production and exportation of few cash crops. Water yam, white yam, Yellow yam, coiling yam, cocoa yam, cassavas, beans (odudu), ugu, okro, akwukwo oho (oha), ahahara vegetable and many others keep the people healthy.  Others are Bananas of all types, oranges, pears, mangoes, cashews, and kola nuts. There are plenty of vegetables and fruits. Indeed, some species of fruit like nturu, a fruit which, once you lick it, you eat or drink anything and it would taste as if it has sugar in your mouth. It has been speculated that this fruit could be harnessed and used for diabetic patients in place of sugar.

Palm produce is about the main export and it sustains many households. The interesting thing is that these palms trees up till now grow wild. There has been no attempt by locals to turn what is natural into organised plantations. The government too has done nothing to encourage local or foreign investors in this area.

Minerals
Eluoma is unmapped in terms of minerals but it is believed that the Ubiyi Basin has a rich deposit of fossil fuels.  In addition, Umuebere Nkuma has large store of construction stones and gravels. The Umuokogbuos and the Obdodos, Umuebere Ajas, Ekebes and even Umuama, have construction sand in abundance.

Tourism
There is a cave also called OMU by the community that has attracted people from all over the world for over 7 decades. It is located between Umuebere Nkuma and Eluoma Central School. The cave is called "Omu Ubiyi". Also is the Adaoma river which can pass as a lake with its distinctive setting. In addition, there is a mini water fall in Ezeiyi Umuihuagwu in Obu-Na-Ebere. There are virgin forests for wildlife tourists and festivals at intervals.

Language
Eluoma people speak Igbo language, like all other Igbos but with their distinct dialect. Even in Isuikwuato, one can easily pick out an Eluoma person from his tongue. With the coming of the British as colonial masters to Nigeria, Eluoma people adopted English as their second language.

Religion
Before the coming of the Europeans, Eluoma people were animists and worshiped many gods. These gods included streams like Nneochie, Adaoma, Ubiyi, etc. Some animals also were worshiped as gods, such as Avuala (ajala), that is viper. Some trees were equally regarded as the abode of the gods. Above all, ancestral worship was common to every family.

At the beginning of the 20th century, however, Christianity came to the area. Umuebere Nkuma was the first to be reached  through the effort of the Methodist Church which first landed at Ovim in Isuikwuato. Later, the Roman Catholic Church came from the northern part of Isuikwuato. In the past 30 years, the religious landscape of Eluoma changed with the arrival of the non-denominational Scripture Union and the Assemblies of God. In this 21st Century, Eluoma has Catholics, Methodists, Anglicans and white Garment Churches. There are many Pentecostal churches which drew membership from existing traditional or mainline churches.

Population
There is no official figure as most Eluoma people are living outside the town. However, the population is estimated at 30,000. Umuebere Nkuma has the highest number of old people in Eluoma. Some say this is because the village is separated from the noisy Ahonta and has vegetables, fruits and natural drinking water in abundance.

References
 History of Umuebere Nkuma, I. Okochua, 1978, Enugu
 Oral Interview with Charley, a councillor, 1978
 Oral Interview with Solomon Ukaumunne,1998, Lagos
 Oral Interview with Amaechi Egemba, Isuikwuato, 2008
 Isuikwuato Voice 1995, Lagos
 Welcome Address of ISUCOO Lagos, President, 1995

Towns in Abia State
Tourism in Nigeria